The CNT-II was a single-engine biplane seaplane built by the Italian shipyard Cantiere Navale Triestino (CNT) in 1924.

Design and development
It was destined to participate in the 1925 edition of the Schneider Cup. The CNT-II was characterized by a pushing motor configuration, with one V12 motor  engine delivering . Due to the probable little care in the construction of the hulls, both aircraft sank during the flotation tests. Although recovered and sent for repairs, the project was interrupted.

References

02
Floatplanes
Aircraft first flown in 1924
Biplanes
Single-engined pusher aircraft